Pâmela Nogueira (born 17 July 1988) is a Brazilian synchronized swimmer. She competed in the women's team event at the 2016 Summer Olympics.

References

1988 births
Living people
Brazilian synchronized swimmers
Olympic synchronized swimmers of Brazil
Synchronized swimmers at the 2016 Summer Olympics
Place of birth missing (living people)
Pan American Games medalists in synchronized swimming
Pan American Games bronze medalists for Brazil
South American Games gold medalists for Brazil
South American Games medalists in synchronized swimming
Synchronized swimmers at the 2011 Pan American Games
Competitors at the 2010 South American Games
Medalists at the 2011 Pan American Games
21st-century Brazilian women